West Coast Highway may refer to:
West Coast Highway, Perth, Western Australia
West Coast Highway, Singapore